Diketo may refer to:

 Diketo (game), a children's game similar to Jacks played in South Africa
 Diketone, a chemical molecule